Tudor Stănescu (born 19 June 1989) is a Romanian handballer who plays for Steaua București and the Romania national team.

Achievements 
Liga Națională: 
Silver Medalist: 2018

Individual awards 
All-Star Goalkeeper of the Liga Națională: 2018

References

  
1989 births
Living people 
Sportspeople from Vaslui
Romanian male handball players 
CSA Steaua București (handball) players